Pancha may refer to:

Pancha (garment), an item of male clothing worn in South Asia
A clan of the Bharwad people of India
Pancha Carrasco (1826–1890), Costa Rica's first woman in the military
Pancha Merino (born 1973), Chilean actress and television presenter

See also